Lacena Golding-Clarke (born March 20, 1975 in Clarendon, Jamaica) is a retired female  hurdling athlete from Jamaica. She represented Jamaica at the Summer Olympics in 1996, 2000 and 2004, and took part in the World Championships in Athletics on five separate occasions.

Career

She began her career as a long jumper and she participated in this event at the 1996 and 2000 Olympic Games. Her personal best jump is 6.87 metres, achieved in June 1998 in Kingston.

She won a gold medal in the 100 metres hurdles at the 2002 Commonwealth Games. Her personal best time is 12.68 seconds, achieved in June 2005 in Kingston. Other high points of her hurdles career included a bronze at the 2003 Pan American Games and a bronze at the 2006 Commonwealth Games.

She retired from track and field in 2010 after having reached her sixth consecutive 60 m final at the IAAF World Indoor Championships.

After graduating from Auburn University with a BA in Political Science and Government in 1999, Golding-Clarke was a volunteer assistant coach at Auburn from March 1999 to August 2006 and then moved to the University of Texas at Austin to work as a coach from September 2006 to 2011. In May 2012, Golding-Clarke became the assistant coach at the University of Texas at El Paso (UTEP). While at UTEP, Golding-Clarke coached 13 All-Americans, 32 regional qualifiers, 32 C-USA individual title winners, and eight school record-breakers, including Tobi Amusan, the first Nigerian athlete to win a gold medal at the World Athletics Championships. Amusan finished the 100-meter hurdles in 12.12 seconds, breaking the previous world record of 12.20 seconds set by US Olympian Kendra Harrison in 2016. In January 2022, Golding-Clarke returned to Auburn University as Assistant Coach for the Women’s Sprints and Hurdles.

Achievements

External links

Picture of Lacena Golding-Clarke - Berlin 2009

References

1975 births
Living people
People from Clarendon Parish, Jamaica
Jamaican female hurdlers
Jamaican female long jumpers
Athletes (track and field) at the 1996 Summer Olympics
Athletes (track and field) at the 2000 Summer Olympics
Athletes (track and field) at the 2004 Summer Olympics
Athletes (track and field) at the 2003 Pan American Games
Olympic athletes of Jamaica
Athletes (track and field) at the 1998 Commonwealth Games
Athletes (track and field) at the 2002 Commonwealth Games
Athletes (track and field) at the 2006 Commonwealth Games
Commonwealth Games medallists in athletics
Commonwealth Games gold medallists for Jamaica
Pan American Games medalists in athletics (track and field)
Pan American Games bronze medalists for Jamaica
Medalists at the 2003 Pan American Games
Central American and Caribbean Games medalists in athletics
Medallists at the 2002 Commonwealth Games